Perot may refer to:

People
 Ross Perot (1930–2019), United States business leader and presidential candidate
 H. Ross Perot, Jr. (born 1958), United States businessman and son of Ross Perot
 Alfred Pérot (1863–1925), French physicist
 William Bennett Perot (1791–1871), early postmaster of Bermuda; see Perot Island, Bermuda
 Perot de Garbalei (fl. 1300), author of Divisiones Mundi

Other uses
 Perot Systems, an information technology company led by Ross and H. Ross Perot
 Perot Museum of Nature and Science, Dallas, Texas, United States

See also 
 Perrot (disambiguation)
 Perreau, a surname